Orysa (also Oryza) is an unincorporated community in Lauderdale County, Tennessee, United States.

References

Unincorporated communities in Lauderdale County, Tennessee
Unincorporated communities in Tennessee